The following is a list of neighborhoods, districts, and other places located in the city of Greensboro, North Carolina. The list is organized by broad geographical section within the city. While there is no official list of neighborhoods, districts, and places, this list was compiled from the sources listed in the External links section, as well as from information compiled from residents of Greensboro.

Greensboro's neighborhoods have no "official" borders, such that some of the places listed below may overlap geographically, and residents are not always in agreement with where one neighborhood ends and another begins.

Historically, many neighborhoods were defined by platted subdivisions. Others were originally villages before being incorporated as part of the city. Still more complicated is the fact that in some parts of Greensboro, especially the central areas of East and South Greensboro, residents have long been more likely to identify with the name of their section of the city than with any specific neighborhood name. Today, community-based organizations, homeowner's associations, neighborhood watches, and other civic organizations are an influential force in shaping the use of neighborhood names and approximate boundaries.

North Greensboro

Fisher Park Breadth: North to Wendover Avenue, East to the Southern Railway, South to Smith Street, East to Wharton Street.
Lake Jeanette
Latham Park
Irving Park
New Irving Park
Bur-Mil Park
Kirkwood

East Greensboro
Aycock
Bessemer
Dudley Heights
Old L. Richardson
East White Oaks, Greensboro, North Carolina
White Oak New Town
Willow Oaks
Little Mexico

South Greensboro
Adams Farm
Asheboro Square
Grandover
Ole Asheboro
Sedgefield Breadth: North to Gate City Boulevard, East to Groomtown Road, South to Rockingham Road, East, West to Guilford College Road.
Southside Greensboro, North Carolina-Randleman Rd., Holden Rd., W. Florida St., S. Elm Eugene St., (Smith Homes, Hampton Homes, Parkside, J.T. Hariston Homes, Terrell Street Apts., Wynnmere)

West Greensboro
Carriage Hills
College Hill Breadth: North to West Market Street, East to Spring Street, South to the Southern Railroad, West to McIver Street.
Friendly Homes
Glenwood Breadth: North to West Gate City Boulevard, East to Freeman Mill Road, West to Coliseum Boulevard.
Green Valley
Hamilton Lakes 
Jefferson Woods
Lindley Park
Starmount 
Starmount Forest
Wedgewood
Sunset Hills
The Cardinal
Guilford College
Westerwood
Lake Daniel
Friendswood

References

External links
 Greensboro Neighborhood Congress
  City of Greensboro Neighborhood Development Department
  Preservation Greensboro Incorporated